Raudsepa may refer to several places in Estonia:
Raudsepa, Valga County, village in Estonia
Raudsepa, Rõuge Parish, village in Võru County, Estonia
Raudsepa, Võru Parish, village in Võru County, Estonia

See also
Raudsepä